James H. White House, also known as Marshall House, is a historic home located at Marshall, Madison County, North Carolina.  It was designed by noted Asheville architect Richard Sharp Smith and built in 1903. It is a two-story-and-attic frame dwelling sheathed in a thick stucco known as "pebbledash."  The front facade features a one-story recessed wraparound porch with an attached conical-roofed gazebo.  The house was remodeled between 1925 and 1930.

It was listed on the National Register of Historic Places in 1989.

References

Houses on the National Register of Historic Places in North Carolina
Houses completed in 1903
Houses in Madison County, North Carolina
National Register of Historic Places in Madison County, North Carolina